Bolemka is a river of Poland, a tributary of the Noteć near Chodzież.

Rivers of Poland
Rivers of Greater Poland Voivodeship